Freedom Schools were temporary, alternative, and free schools for African Americans mostly in the South. They were originally part of a nationwide effort during the Civil Rights Movement to organize African Americans to achieve social, political and economic equality in the United States. The most prominent example of Freedom Schools was in Mississippi during the summer of 1964.

Origins

Despite the Supreme Court's ruling of 1954 in the Brown v. Board of Education case striking down segregated school systems, in the mid-1960s Mississippi still maintained separate and unequal white and "colored" school systems. On average, the state spent $81.66 to educate a white student compared to only $21.77 for a black student. Mississippi was one of only two states in the union that did not have a mandatory education law and many children in rural areas were sent to work in the fields and received little education at all. Even the curriculum was different for white and black. As a typical example, the white school board of Bolivar County mandated that "Neither foreign languages nor civics shall be taught in Negro schools. Nor shall American history from 1860 to 1875 be taught."

In late 1963, Charles Cobb,
a Student Nonviolent Coordinating Committee (SNCC) activist, proposed the organization sponsor a network of Freedom Schools, inspired by examples of the concept used previously in other cities.
In the summer of 1963, the county board of education in Prince Edward County, Virginia had closed the public schools rather than integrate them after having been sued in a case following Brown vs. Board of Education, and so Freedom Schools emerged in their stead.
In September, 1963, about 3,000 students participated in a Stay Out for Freedom protest in Boston opting instead to attend community-organized Freedom Schools.
On October 22, 1963, known as Freedom Day, more than 200,000 students boycotted the Chicago Public Schools to protest  segregation and poor school conditions, with some attending Freedom Schools instead.
Subsequently, on February 3, 1964 in a similar Freedom day protest, over 450,000 students participated in a boycott of the New York City public schools in what was the largest civil rights demonstration of the 1960s,
and up to 100,000 students attended alternative Freedom Schools.

Mississippi Freedom Schools
The Mississippi Freedom Schools were developed as part of the 1964 Freedom Summer civil rights project, a massive effort that focused on voter registration drives and educating Mississippi students for social change.  The Council of Federated Organizations (COFO)—an umbrella civil rights organization of activists and funds drawn from SNCC, CORE, NAACP, and SCLC—among other organizations, coordinated Freedom Summer.

The project was essentially a statewide voter registration campaign, and the framers called for one thousand volunteers to assist in the undertaking. Activists made plans to conduct a parallel Democratic primary election, because the systematic exclusion of black voters resulted in all-white delegations to presidential primaries.  These efforts culminated in the creation of the Mississippi Freedom Democratic Party. Both the official delegation and the Mississippi Freedom Democratic Party went to the 1964 Democratic National Convention in Atlantic City, New Jersey.

In December 1963, during planning for the upcoming Freedom Summer project, Charles Cobb proposed a network of "Freedom Schools" that would foster political participation among Mississippi elementary and high school students, in addition to offering academic courses and discussions. Activists organizing the Freedom Summer project accepted Cobb's proposal and in March 1964 organized a curriculum planning conference in New York under the sponsorship of the National Council of Churches. Spelman College history professor Staughton Lynd was appointed Director of the Freedom School program.

Over the course of Freedom Summer, more than 40 Freedom Schools were set up in black communities throughout Mississippi. The purpose was to try to end political displacement of African Americans by encouraging students to become active citizens and socially involved within the community. Over 3,000 African American students attended these schools in the summer of 1964. Students ranged in age from small children to the very elderly with the average approximately 15 years old. Teachers were volunteers, most of whom were college students themselves.

Political and educational objectives
The Freedom Schools were conceptualized with both political and educational objectives. Freedom School teachers would educate elementary and high school students to become social change agents that would participate in the ongoing Civil Rights Movement, most often in voter registration efforts. The curriculum adopted was divided into seven core areas that analyzed the social, political, and economic context of precarious race relations and the Civil Rights Movement. Leadership development was encouraged, in addition to more traditional academic skills.  The education at Freedom Schools was student-centered and culturally relevant. Curriculum and instruction was based on the needs of the students, discussion among students and teachers (rather than lecturing) was encouraged, and curriculum planners encouraged teachers to base instruction on the experiences of their students.

Curriculum
Curriculum development revolved around The Curriculum Conference, which consisted of teachers and directors discussing the type of education that would be taught at the freedom schools.  The teachers were to write an outline for their curriculum planning.  They were told to keep in mind what life was like in Mississippi and the short amount of time that they had to teach the material.  The curriculum had to be teacher-friendly and immediately useful to the students, while being based on questions and activities. The primary focus was questions and discussion rather than memorization of facts and dates. Instructions to teachers included:

In the matter of classroom procedure, questioning is the vital tool. It is meaningless to flood the student with information he cannot understand; questioning is the path to enlightenment... The value of the Freedom Schools will derive mainly from what the teachers are able to elicit from the students in terms of comprehension and expression of their experiences.

Since the curriculum conference brought together citizens of different backgrounds and origins, the final curriculum outline incorporated material from different origins and consisted of three different sections.

The three sections of the Freedom School curriculum were the Academic Curriculum, the Citizenship Curriculum, and the Recreational Curriculum.  The purpose of these sections was to teach students social change within the school; regional history; black history; how to answer open-ended questions; and the development of academic skills. The Academic Curriculum consisted of reading, writing, and verbal activities that were based on the student's own experiences. The Citizenship Curriculum was to encourage the students to ask questions about the society. The Recreational Curriculum required the student to be physically active.

In most of the schools, the Citizenship Curriculum focused on two sets of inter-related questions for class discussion:

 Why are we (teachers and students) in Freedom Schools?
 What is the Freedom Movement?
 What alternatives does the Freedom Movement offer us?

 What does the majority culture have that we want?
 What does the majority culture have that we don't want?
 What do we have that we want to keep?

First year
Freedom Schools opened during the first week of July 1964, after approximately 250 Freedom School volunteer teachers attended one-week training sessions at Western College for Women in Oxford, Ohio. The original plans had anticipated 25 Freedom Schools and 1,000 students; by the end of the summer, 41 schools had been opened to over 2,500 students.

Freedom Schools were established with the help and commitment of local communities, who provided various buildings for schools and housing for the volunteer teachers. While some of the schools were held in parks, kitchens, residential homes, and under trees, most classes were held in churches or church basements. Attendance varied throughout the summer.  Some schools experienced consistent attendance, but that was the exception.  Because attendance was not compulsory, recruitment and maintaining attendance was perhaps the primary challenge the schools faced. In Clarksdale, Mississippi, for instance, the average student attendance during the first week was fifteen, the second week was eight, but at any point during the summer the school may have had in attendance as many as thirty-five students. It was not uncommon for adults to attend class regularly.

Instruction was changed based on local conditions. In rural communities where students were expected to work during the school day, classes were often held at night. In schools that maintained traditional school hours, typically in urban areas, citizenship curriculum and traditional academic courses were offered in the morning and special classes such as music, drama, and typing were offered in the afternoon. In many instances, entire school days would be devoted to voter registration efforts. It was imperative for SNCC activists that students would be invested in civil rights activity because this cadre of students was expected to remain in the state to enact social change.

At the conclusion of the Freedom School term, activists and students organized a student-led conference on August 8, 1964, the day after the funeral of James Chaney, one of the victims in the murders of Chaney, Goodman, and Schwerner. The conference was held in Meridian, Mississippi, at the former Meridian Baptist Seminary. The school was described as "the palace of the Freedom School circuit." Each Freedom School sent three representatives to the conference to form a youth platform for the Mississippi Freedom Democratic Party. The student delegates discussed issues related to jobs, schools, foreign affairs, and public accommodations and proffered recommendations for the state party. By the end of the conference, students prepared a statement that demanded access to public accommodations, building codes for each home, integrated schools, a public works program, and the appointment of qualified blacks to state positions.

Freedom School teachers and students remained committed to the Freedom School concept. In early August 1964, plans were being made to continue the Freedom Schools during the upcoming school year, and some volunteer teachers had already agreed to stay. Students decided, however, during the Freedom School Conference in early August to not continue the schools. Yet students implemented the leadership and activism experienced during the summer in their own schools. Some students returned to school and demanded better facilities and more courses. Students in Philadelphia, Mississippi, returned to school wearing SNCC "One Man, One Vote" buttons—for which they were expelled.

Freedom Library Day School, Philadelphia
The Philadelphia Freedom Library was founded by John E. Churchville in 1964.  Over the next few years he began to offer evening classes and eventually converted the library into a school.  Upon the founding of this school, he prepared a short set of essays which were published in the book, What Black Educators Are Saying, edited by Nathan Wright Jr. and published in 1970.  This essay includes much of Churchville's thoughts on the state of the Black Power movement as well as his ideas for the pedagogy of his new Freedom School.  He denigrates the ideas of both the cultural and progressive nationalist movements as being facades and without teeth.  For him, the Revolutionary Nationalist Movement which called for total and complete revolution both here and everywhere on earth, was the most accurate and true to its principles.  They identified both intragroup and intraindividual issues facing black people in America and the only way to truly become a revolutionary was to be born-again; acted on by an outside power which began to rid you of these deficiencies.  The schools themselves were based on a simple set of priorities.  If education is the indoctrination of the young into an ideological system, then the Freedom School must reeducate black children to reject the dominant ideology and construct a new system.  To do this, the first element of pedagogy to be established must be the new ideology of the school.  After this, teachers must be found who can bridge the gap between identity and alienation, being object lessons for their students both inside and outside the classroom. Finally, the curriculum was designed to explain the objective situation of black people and teach the tools and skills to deal with this reality.  The curriculum as described by Churchville was merely a vehicle for teaching revolutionary truth; the content was mostly irrelevant as it was the analysis which would demonstrate the reality. The school was raided by the FBI on August 13, 1966 on suspicion of harboring militant groups.  After the raid, Churchville dropped out of activism.

Legacy

Part of the Freedom School legacy can be seen in the schools that hold the name today: Akwesasne Freedom School on a Mohawk Indian reservation; The Freedom Schools in St. Louis, Missouri and Chicago, Illinois, the Tyree Scott Freedom School in Seattle, Washington, and the Paulo Freire Freedom School in Tucson, Arizona.

The Children's Defense Fund (CDF) operates a nationwide modern Freedom School program.  This program is coordinated through the Children's Defense Fund's Black Community Crusade for Children initiative.  The CDF Freedom Schools national program operates over 130 summer program sites in 24 states across the country serving nearly 7,200 children.

In Michigan the Black Radical Congress in Detroit launched a campaign to create a model based on the Freedom Schools.

Philadelphia Freedom Schools is an independent community education initiative operating a modern version of the Mississippi curriculum with an emphasis on academic scholarship,  social action and intergenerational leadership. Philadelphia Freedom Schools are organized through a lead agency, Communities In Schools.

Atlanta's Freedom University, a modern-day freedom school and only school in the world where all students are undocumented immigrants, offers a tuition-free, liberatory college curriculum that helps undocumented youth access higher education.

See also
Ruleville, Mississippi
Gluckstadt, Mississippi
Carthage, Mississippi

Footnotes

Further reading

 William Sturkey and Jon N. Hale (eds.), To Write in the Light of Freedom: The Newspapers of the 1964 Mississippi Freedom Schools. Jackson, MS: University Press of Mississippi, 2015.
 Jon N. Hale, The Freedom Schools: Student Activists in the Mississippi Civil Rights Movement. (New York: Columbia University Press, 2016)

External links
 1964 MS Freedom School Curriculum
 History of the Mississippi Freedom School & Freedom Summer 
 Lessons from Freedom Summer ~ textbook support for studying the 1964 Freedom School Curriculum
 Spartacus Educational Site
 Sankofa Freedom Academy Charter School
 Information about Black Community Crusade for Children 
 Freedom Summer and the Freedom Schools
Philadelphia Freedom Schools Program Description 
Freedom Schools ~ Civil Rights Movement Archive
Chicago Freedom School
Gary Freedom School 
San Francisco Freedom School
Sunflower County Freedom Project

African-American history of Mississippi
Education segregation in Mississippi